Uprising is the third studio album by Scottish metalcore band Bleed from Within, released on 25 March 2013 through Century Media Records. It is the band's first record to feature guitarist Martyn Evans, who replaced founding guitarist Dave Lennon in 2011.

Track listing

Credits 
Writing, performance and production credits are adapted from the album liner notes.

Personnel

Bleed from Within 
 Scott Kennedy – vocals
 Craig "Goonzi" Gowans – guitar
 Martyn Evans – guitar
 Davie Provan – bass
 Ali Richardson – drums

Guest musicians 
 Liam Cormier – vocals on "The War Around Us"

Additional musicians 
 Adam "Nolly" Getgood (Periphery) – guitar solo on "Leech"
 Ben Morgan – backing vocals on "Escape Yourself"

Production 
 Bleed from Within – production
 Romesh Dodangoda – production, drum recording
 Adam "Nolly" Getgood – production, guitar recording
 Martyn "Ginge" Ford – production, vocals recording
 Rob Thomas – engineering (drums only)
 Logan Mader – mixing, mastering

Bonus tracks production 
 Craig "Goonzi" Gowans – production, recording
 Adam "Nolly" Getgood – mixing

Artwork and design 
 Thomas Bates – artwork, layout
 Tom Barnes – photography

Studios 
 Monnow Valley Studios, Monmouth, UK – drum recording
 Getgood Studios, Bath, UK – guitar recording
 Nott-In-Pill Studios, Newport, UK – vocals recording
 12 Inch Audio – recording (bonus tracks only)

Charts

References

External links 
 
 Uprising at Century Media Records

2013 albums
Bleed from Within albums
Century Media Records albums
Albums produced by Romesh Dodangoda